Gråvåhø or Gråvåhøi is a mountain in Lom Municipality in Innlandet county, Norway. The mountain is surrounded by several other notable mountains including Skarvhøi to the northwest; Veslekjølen and Ilvetjørnhøi to the west; Kvitingskjølen to the southwest; and Grjothovden, Saukampen, and Liaberget to the southeast.

See also
List of mountains of Norway

References

Lom, Norway
Mountains of Innlandet